Rías Altas (also called "Upper Rias") is the northernmost of three sections of A Costa do Marisco (the Seafood Coast) in Galicia, Spain. It extends from the port of Ribadeo to Santa Cruz.

The Upper Rias refers to the coast of the northern part of A Coruña Province and the entire coastline of the Lugo Province.

The biggest city port of the Upper Rias is Ferrol - the most important Naval Station in North-western Spain.

Major commercial and fishing ports 

 Ferrol - Major Commercial Ports (also: Military) -  - A Coruña Province
 Cedeira -  Fishing Port -  - A Coruña Province
 Cariño - Fishing Port -  - A Coruña Province
 Espasante -  Fishing Port -  - A Coruña Province
 O Barqueiro -  Fishing Port -  - A Coruña Province
 Viveiro -  Fishing Port -  - Lugo Province
 San Cibrao -  Major Commercial Port  (also: Fishing Port) -   - Lugo Province
 Burela -  Fishing Port -  - Lugo Province
 Foz -  Fishing Port -  - Lugo Province
 Ribadeo -  Fishing Port -  - Lugo Province

Note: For those who want to read further about the, non-military ports of, "Ferrol-San Cibrao Port Authority" which covers about 95% of the Coast of the Upper Rias, including all its ports and lighthouses from San Cibrao to Ferrol, it is advisable to visit the external official link which follows:

International World Surf Competitions 
 The Ferrolterra Pantin Classic gathers every year some of the most international and remarkable figures in the world of surf 
 Doninos, Esmelle and St. George's Beach the north of the A Coruña Province is known for the quality of its beaches as most of them are ideal for Water Sports like surfing.

Locations along the Upper Rias
These are some of the towns, villages, hamlets and cities along the Upper Rias Coast (that is, the "Rías Altas") including the Naval Station and the largest city port of the Upper Rias: Ferrol.

Ribadeo
Rinlo
Reinante
San Cosme de Barreiros
Foz
Fazouro
Cangas de Foz
Burela
Punta de Laxes
Coido
San Cibrao
Praia do Lago
Porto Celo
Viveiro
O Vicedo
O Barqueiro
Estaca de Bares
Punta Maeda
Espasante
Ortigueira
Cariño
Cabo Ortegal
Costa da Capelada
San Andrés de Teixido
Punta Candieira
Ria de Cedeira
Villarrube
Valdoviño
Montefaro
Casal
Ponzos
Cabo Prior
Doniños
Cabo Prioriño
Castelo de San Felipe
Ferrol
Mugardos
Ares
Perbes
Miño
Sada
Gandario
Cornoedo
Lorbé
Illa a Marola
Mera
Santa Cruz

See also 
 The Death Coast (also "Costa da Morte") with its biggest city port in A Coruña.
 The Lower Rias (also "Rías Baixas") with its biggest city port in Vigo.
 A Costa do Marisco, Galicia (Spain)

Green Spain
Coasts of Spain
Tourism in Spain
Landforms of Galicia (Spain)